Dorothy Jardon (born Mary Jardon; June 1, 1883 – September 30, 1966) was an American soprano and actress. She sang the role of the gypsy in the operetta The Wedding Trip with lyrics by Harry B. Smith, and music by Reginald DeKoven in 1912 and with the Chicago Opera in the title role of  Fedora in 1919. She made several recordings for Brunswick. Among her acting credits she took the role of Bimoula in Oh! Oh! Delphine!, a musical comedy by C.M.S. McLellan, with music by Ivan Caryll at the Shaftesbury Theatre, London, 18 February 1913.

Jardon was born in New York to Ignace Jardon, a chef who immigrated to the United States from France in 1864, and Bridget Jardon (née Kavanagh), who immigrated from Ireland in 1884. She was married first to Edward Michael Madden and secondly to Harry Edmond Oelrichs. She died in Los Angeles in 1966.

References

1883 births
1966 deaths
Actresses from New York City
Singers from New York City
American people of French descent
American people of Irish descent
American sopranos
20th-century American singers
20th-century American women singers